The Chagai Hills is a range of granite hills in the Chagai District in Pakistan's Balochistan province.

Location
The Chagai Hills  lie between 28' 46" to 29' 34" N and 63' 18" to 64' 50" in a desert area in the northernmost part of Chagai District north of Pakistan's Ras Koh Hills and south of Afghanistan's Helmand and Nimruz provinces.

Topography 
The Chagai Hills are granite mountains, which, at their highest point, rise to a height of 2640 m above sea level. They stretch over an area that is approximately 175 km in length and 95 km in width.

Climate
The Chagai Hills lie in an arid zone, which is outside the main monsoon belt. The region receives an average of 4 inches (102 mm) annually. The temperature is extreme: very hot in summer and very cold in winter. The average minimum temperature is 2.4 °C (36.3 °F) in January and the average maximum temperature is 42.5 °C (108.5 °F) in July.

Nuclear tests

 
The Chagai Hills were not the location of Pakistan's Chagai-I nuclear tests of 28 May 1998, which were at the Ras Koh Hills, an entirely different range of hills to the south of the Chagai Hills, separated from them by a large valley. However, confusion may arise because widespread reporting prior to the actual explosion mentioned the Chagai Hills region, and because both the Chagai Hills and the Ras Koh Hills are situated in the Chagai District.

References

Hills of Pakistan
Chagai District
Landforms of Balochistan (Pakistan)